Antonija Nađ (born 8 May 1986 in Bezdan, SR Serbia, Yugoslavia) is a Serbian sprint canoer.

She won silver medals in the K-1 1000 m event at the 2008 Canoe Sprint European Championships in Milan and 2011 Canoe Sprint European Championships in Belgrade.

Before she started to train canoeing she practised karate.

References
 Biography

1986 births
Living people
Serbian female canoeists
Olympic canoeists of Serbia
Canoeists at the 2012 Summer Olympics
People from Bezdan
Mediterranean Games silver medalists for Serbia
Mediterranean Games bronze medalists for Serbia
Competitors at the 2009 Mediterranean Games
Competitors at the 2013 Mediterranean Games
Mediterranean Games medalists in canoeing
Sportspeople from Sombor